Di is a department or commune of Sourou Province in north-western Burkina Faso. Its capital lies at the town of Di.

Towns and villages
 Di	(5 795 inhabitants)
 Benkadi	(959 inhabitants)
 Bossé	(1 227 inhabitants)
 Bouna	(839 inhabitants)
 Débé	(3 230 inhabitants)
 Donon	(567 inhabitants)
 Koromé	(172 inhabitants)
 Lo	(224 inhabitants)
 Niassan	(3 830 inhabitants)
 Niassari	(194 inhabitants)
 Oué	(2 141 inhabitants)
 Poro	(1 214 inhabitants)
 Poura	(879 inhabitants)
 Toma-Ilé	(589 inhabitants)
 Toma-koura	(298 inhabitants)
 Tourou	(279 inhabitants)
 Touroukoro	(286 inhabitants)

References

Departments of Burkina Faso
Sourou Province